Valérie Grand'Maison (born October 12, 1988) is a Canadian former swimmer and Paralympic champion. Over two Summer Paralympic Games she won a total of six medals setting multiple world records in Paralympic swimming.

Biography 
Valérie Grand'Maison started swimming at the age of seven years and started to compete competitively at the age of nine years with the swimming club CAMO of Montréal. Grand'Maison developed a condition that degrades the vision of the eyes called macular degeneration at the age of 12.  By the age of 15, she had already lost most of the vision in both her eyes.  Pierre Lamy, her swimming coach at the time, suggested that she get classified as an athlete who is handicapped.

At the 2005 Canada Games in Regina she qualified to be part of the Canadian Handicapped Swimming Team. She then participated at the Commonwealth Games held in Melbourne, Australia. In 2006 at the National Swimming Paralympic Championships in South Africa, she won seven medals with five of them being gold.  She also established a new record for the 100 Metre free.
At the 2008 Summer Paralympics Grand’Maison won six medals, with three of them being gold.  One gold was for the 100 Metre Butterfly, another for the 100 Metre Free and the last for the 400 Metre Free.  In addition she broke two world records.

In 2010 a right shoulder injury put her career on hold. Grand'Maison changed her swimming schedule to accommodate the injury. She was a member of the McGill University Marlets and trained under the guidance of coach Peter Carpenter.

In 2011, at the Pan-Pacific Championships in Edmonton, Grand'Maison raced the 200 m individual medley and won the gold medal. She also added three silver medals and one bronze to her collection. Grand'Maison finished second in the 50 m freestyle, 200 m freestyle and 100 m breaststroke. In addition, she won third place in the 100 m butterfly and fifth in the 100 m freestyle.

At the 2012 Summer Paralympics in London, Grand'Maison participated in the 50 m and 100 m freestyle, 100 m breakstroke and 200 m individual medley events. She won silver medals in the 50 m and 100 m freestyle (S13) and a gold medal in the 200 m medley, setting a world record.

Grand'Maison's final international competition was the 2013 IPC Swimming World Championships held in her hometown of Montreal, Canada.

Personal life 
Grand'Maison attended McGill University where she completed her undergraduate degree in Psychology and History. Whilst at McGill University, she was coached by Peter Carpenter until her retirement from professional swimming in 2013.

Performance History 
Grand'Maison has competed at a number of events around the world including World Championships and Paralympic games. She has held multiple S13 world records.

References

External links 
 Meet McGill Paralympian Valérie Grand’Maison – McGill Reporter
 
 

1988 births
Living people
Canadian female backstroke swimmers
Canadian female breaststroke swimmers
Canadian female butterfly swimmers
Canadian female freestyle swimmers
Canadian female medley swimmers
Paralympic swimmers of Canada
Paralympic gold medalists for Canada
Paralympic silver medalists for Canada
Swimmers at the 2008 Summer Paralympics
Swimmers at the 2012 Summer Paralympics
Medalists at the 2008 Summer Paralympics
Medalists at the 2012 Summer Paralympics
Canadian blind people
World record holders in paralympic swimming
S13-classified Paralympic swimmers
Sportspeople from Sherbrooke
Medalists at the World Para Swimming Championships
Paralympic medalists in swimming
21st-century Canadian women